Ali Imran is a fictional spymaster and the protagonist of the Imran Series of Urdu spy novels by the Pakistani author Ibn-e-Safi.

Ali Imran enjoys living around a complete family: a father, mother, and a sister. Several of Imran's female cousins, often found making fun of him, lives with his family.

Imran's dearly attachment with his family is evident in some of the books. For example, In the "Allama Dehshatnak" serial, he finds the only way to anger the villain is by getting personal with him and mocking his history and the fact that his family was very brutally destroyed. By doing so however, Imran provokes the villain to counter by bombing his family's house. At this point the reader sees how deeply Imran loves his family as he rushes to the scene throwing all the caution out of the window.

Imran's parents, it is also often told, are Yusufzai Pashtuns and direct descendant of Genghis Khan.

Ali Imran's Family

Karam Rahman
(Fazal Rehman "F Rahman")

Rehman Sahib is Imran's father and the director general of Intelligence Bureau.

Imran's grandfather (From father side) "Dada" named his son Rehman Sahib as "Fazal Rahman".
Imran's grandfather (From mother side) "Nana" named his son Rehman Sahib as "Karim Rehman".

Some translated line from Ibn-e-Safi Imran Series book 93 Sah Rangi Mout:
"And yes! Perhaps I wrote the name of Rahman Sahib's grandfather, Karam Rehman, in the bookletters of the previous book. Many of my readers have mentioned that their name is Fazal Rahman (F Rahman). Well, What can I do with their grandparents and grandmothers?.... This affair went on with their grandparents and grandparents. Nana used to call "karmu" and grandpa used to say "waste" .... I remember the name of Nanali when writing pashers .... Well .... if you too are his grandfather's If you are biased, what will I do? Same with "F Rahman".

Some translated lines from Ibn-e-Safi Imran Series book 92 Kaali Kehkishan, Paishras:

"Twenty years later, a person has pointed to one of my "sins".
The request is that this respect is limited to mere nouns. People have not been so careful in regard to virtues. You will often hear this kind of noise on the streets, "Abbey o Ghaffarey" or "oh Rahimey going where." ? "
To my dismay, the only reason for this failure is that Allah has declared His attributes to be a worthy servant. God bless. If I am wrong, God will forgive me.
Many Islamic scholars also read my books. Would be grateful if they could guide me in this regard. By the way, Imran's father's full name is not Abdul Rahman but Karam Rehman. I call myself K.Rahman and I have written "Rehman sir" from the beginning till now! Not just Rehman, he also wrote that the arrogant side had come out."

Rahman Sahib has a stern personality and a strict dictator. He is somewhat responsible for Imran's paradoxical personality. Initially wanting Imran to become a professor at a local university, he was very upset when Imran was appointed as a special officer in his own department. Later, he cancelled Imran's license by dismissing his roguery strategies that he employed for catching a smuggler in "Bhayanak Aadmi" (The Frightening Man - #4). Highly annoyed by Imran and his actions, he then ordered him to leave the house.

Mr. Rahman is the Director General of the Central Intelligence Bureau, and a very strict person both at home and in the office. Although Imran solves a very mysterious case in "Bhayanak Aadmi", he does not like the way Imran handles the situation; so he fires Imran and also asks him to leave the family house. Underneath his tough exterior, he loves Imran and is internally pleased with his successes. However, his stubbornness does not allow him to reveal his sentiments.

Amma Bi
Imran's mother, Amma Bi, is an eastern style housewife. She is a victim of the strict nature of her husband, Abdul Rehman. When Imran is forced to leave the house, she is against the decision but is helpless to do anything because of her husband. In some novels, it is shown that when Imran visits her, she gets emotional and starts crying, beating him with her slippers.

Surayya
Imran's younger sister Surayya is blessed with the strict nature of her father. She is also fed up with Imran's unserious behavior and lets no opportunity slide to show her anger towards her brother. Imran's love for his sister is shown in the novel "Aadha Teeter" in which Imran struggles to protect her Fiancée from a blackmailer.

See also

 Ibn-e-Safi
 Imran Series
 Ali Imran
 Imran series characters

External links
 Other Characters in Imran Series

Ibn-e-Safi
Imran Series